Myittha Township is a township of Kyaukse District in the Mandalay Region of Myanmar. The capital is Myittha. Myittha Township consists of 6 wards and 227 villages.

Townships of Mandalay Region